Jeffrey S. Longbine (born April 24, 1962) is a Republican member of the Kansas Senate, representing the 17th district since 2010. Longbine has served as Vice President of the Senate since 2017.

Longbine is the owner of the car dealership Longbine Autoplaza in Emporia.

Committee assignments
Sen. Longbine serves on these legislative committees:
 Financial Institutions and Insurance (chair)
 Federal and State Affairs
 Kansas Public Employees Retirement System Select (vice chair)
 Joint Committee on Corrections and Juvenile Justice Oversight
 State Building Construction
 Transportation

Major donors
Some of the top contributors to Sen. Longbine's 2012 campaign, according to the Project Vote Smart:
 Jeff Longbine (self-finance), Longbine Enterprises, AT&T, Kansas Chamber of Commerce,   Kansas Association of Insurance Agents, Kansas Livestock Association, Kansas Contractors Association, Kansas Bankers Association, Kansas Food Dealers Association, Kansas Medical Society, Kansas State Farm Insurance Agents, American Council of Engineering Companies of Kansas, Security Benefit Life Insurance, Heavy Contractors Association, Koger Agency, Amidon Plaza Redevelopment LLC, Kansas Jobs PAC, Kansas National Education Association, Farmers Insurance Group, Kansas Dental Association, J.C. Hawes, Kansas Values, BNSF Railway, Senate Republican Leadership Committee of Kansas

Sen. Longbine financed $15,000 of his own campaign, and Longbine Enterprises an additional $15,000, more than any of his other donor groups.

References

External links
 Kansas Legislature
 Project Vote Smart

People from Emporia, Kansas
Republican Party Kansas state senators
Living people
21st-century American politicians
1962 births